Woodham Ferrers is a small village and former civil parish about  southeast of Chelmsford, located between South Woodham Ferrers and Bicknacre, now in the civil parish of Woodham Ferrers and Bicknacre in the county of Essex, England. The village is often shortened to Woodham by those in the area. The village is also sometimes referred to as North Woodham due to its geographical relationship with South Woodham Ferrers. In 2018 it had an estimated population of 617. In 1961 the parish had a population of 2215.

History 
Originally a hermitage during the reign of Henry II the name Woodham was adopted in 1175 when it became a priory, including  of forest stretching towards Danbury.

In the late 13th century the manor of Woodham Ferrers passed briefly to the Scottish noble house of Douglas by virtue of the marriage of William the Hardy, Lord of Douglas to Eleanor de Lovaine, the widow of William de Ferrers of Groby. Eleanor was a ward of Edward I, and had her late husband's manors of Stebbing and Woodham Ferrers made into a dowry for a future re-marriage. Douglas absconded with Eleanor, when she was attending to her late husband's estates in Scotland, and married her c.1288. Douglas, a significant figure on the Scottish side during the First Scottish War of Independence, had his English manors finally forfeited by 1298 when he died of mistreatment in the Tower of London. His son Hugh Douglas having been captured previously at Stebbing in 1296, by the Sheriff of Essex.

There is a residence in the village that was once owned by the Bishop of York and was attacked during the Peasants' Revolt in 1381.

At the turn of the 16th century, the convent was used as a hospital until being returned to the church in 1540.

Due to the proximity of both the Marconi Company and North Weald Airfield, the village was in the flight path for a number of air-raids during World War II; however it was not a direct target itself.

On 1 April 1987 the parish was abolished to form "Woodham Ferrers and Bicknacre" and "South Woodham Ferrers".

Education 
The village is served by St. Mary's C of E primary school.

Religious sites 
St Mary's Church, situated at the south end of the village, was recorded in the Domesday Book in 1086.

References

External links

Villages in Essex
Former civil parishes in Essex